South Texas is a region of the U.S. state of Texas that lies roughly south of—and includes—San Antonio. The southern and western boundary is the Rio Grande, and to the east it is the Gulf of Mexico. The population of this region is about 4.96 million according to the 2017 census estimates. The southern portion of this region is often referred to as the Rio Grande Valley. The eastern portion along the Gulf of Mexico is also referred to as the Coastal Bend.

Greater Houston and Beaumont–Port Arthur are occasionally tied to the region, both for physically being on the southern end of the state and for businesses that use "South Texas" in its name. (i.e. South Texas School of Law, South Texas State Fair, etc). However, the two are more commonly associated with East Texas or Southeast Texas.

Geography

There is no defined northern boundary, although it is believed to be at the city of San Antonio and from an east to west line extending from the Rio Grande near Maverick County to the Gulf of Mexico, but turning southeast at or near Lavaca County, and continuing towards the Gulf of Mexico to separate it from East Texas and Southeast Texas. The Rio Grande serves as the western and southern boundaries and separates Texas from Mexico. The eastern portion of South Texas is bordered by the Gulf of Mexico. South Texas consists of 41 counties. Its terrain is flat, lying on the coastal plain. South Texas is so vast, that there are even subregions. The very southern tip of South Texas, called the Rio Grande Valley, has fertile soils and is known for its citrus production. The eastern portion of South Texas is often referred to as the Coastal Bend; here, coastal salt marshes, estuaries, and wetlands are scattered all around. The western and central parts are known as the South Texas Plains or the Brush Country. Mesquite trees and crop fields dominate the Brush Country.

Counties

The fastest growing county in South Texas is Guadalupe County, growing by 31.3% from 2010 to 2020.
The slowest growing county in South Texas is Refugio County, shrinking by 8.7% from 2010 to 2020.

Cities

Some people consider Houston to be in South Texas for several reasons: numerous businesses in the Houston region contain 'South Texas' in their titles.  The United States District Court for the Southern District of Texas includes the Houston division. However, Houston is most accurately classified as being within Southeast Texas, a subregion of East Texas.

Rivers

Lakes and reservoirs
Choke Canyon Reservoir
Lake Corpus Christi
Falcon Lake
Lake Amistad
Lake Findley
Mitchell Lake
Lake Casa Blanca
Brauning Lake
Calaveras Lake

Bays

Corpus Christi Bay
San Antonio Bay
Baffin Bay
Nueces Bay
Oso Bay
Copano Bay
Aransas Bay
Matagorda Bay
Lavaca Bay
Redfish Bay
Mission Bay

Estuaries and waterways
Rincon Bayou - a bayou in the Nueces River Delta, just north of the mouth of the Nueces River, for Location, see Nueces Bay
Elm Bayou - a bayou on the Victoria-Refugio County line
Gulf Intracoastal Waterway - a navigable route along the Gulf of Mexico without many of the hazards of travel on the open sea
Resacas of the Rio Grande Valley - many oxbow lakes found scattered throughout the lower Rio Grande Valley
Laguna Madre - a long, hypersaline bay that creates a barrier between Padre Island and mainland Texas

Islands
Padre Island
North Padre Island
South Padre Island
Mustang Island
Matagorda Island
Ward Island
San José Island

Climate
The climate of South Texas is varied. The area along the Mexican border is generally semi-arid (Köppen climate classification BSh), while the area from the coast inland to just west of San Antonio has a humid subtropical climate (Köppen Cfa). South Texas weather is affected by the Sierra Madre Oriental mountains to the west, the Gulf of Mexico to the east, and the Chihuahuan Desert to the west/northwest. Moisture from the Pacific is cut off by the Mexican Sierra Madre Occidental and Oriental mountain ranges. Along the coast the climate is best exemplified in the summers when humidity is extremely high though at times arid, depending upon whether tropical moisture from the Gulf and sometimes from the Pacific is flowing in or if the region is cut off from any moisture by high pressure systems, causing long droughts, which occur every few years. Temperatures reach freezing only a few times in the winter and snowfall is rare, usually three inches or less. Summers in this zone are hot and humid, with daily averages above . In addition, areas in Texas that are slightly inland from the Gulf of Mexico, such as San Antonio that border the semi-arid climate zone, generally see a peak of precipitation in the spring, and a deep, drought-like nadir in midsummer. The region itself sees a short wet season from March to May and another one from late August to October, and a dry season elsewhere in the year. The region of South Texas includes the semi-arid ranch country and the wetter Rio Grande Valley. Considered to be the southernmost tip of the American Great Plains region, the inland region has rainfall similar to that of the Northern Plains. The coastal areas are warm most of the year due to currents of the Gulf of Mexico, but can get cold in winter if a strong front comes in, occasionally causing snow at sea level. Rain in the coastal region is more abundant than in the inland region, and subtropical forests line the Rio Grande. Inland, where it is drier, ranches dominate the landscape, characterized by thick, spiny brush and grasslands. The winters in the inland region are cooler and drier, as Arctic air can make it into the region, but snow is rare due to the lack of humidity. Summers are for the most part hot and dry, but at times can be humid if winds come off the warmer Gulf of Mexico. Tornadoes can occur in this region, but less frequently than in other parts of the state.

Hurricanes are the most dangerous weather systems to affect South Texas. Hurricane season is between June and November. However, the Texas coast gets affected usually between August and September, when systems sporadically organize in the southern Gulf around the Bay of Campeche or western Caribbean and the latter months forming off the coast of Africa.

Droughts- Although South Texas summers generally see rainfall in summer months, some years the lack of rain is persistent and leads to water shortages; lake levels drop significantly and lead to municipal water restrictions. In the summer of 2011, numerous records were set. On August 28, 2011, most of South Texas had temperatures reaching 110 °F, breaking many cities' record highs. Furthermore, 95% of the state faced an extreme or exceptional drought, according to the office of the Texas state climatologist. These drought conditions led to a string of dangerous wildfires across the state, and the enforcement of burn bans in 250 of the 254 counties in Texas.

Tornadoes do occur in this part of the state, but not as frequently as other parts. They approach, usually from the northwest to southeast, as a line of severe thunderstorms, mostly in the summer months and by cold fronts in fall.

Snow rarely falls south of San Antonio or on the coast except in rare circumstances. Of note is the 2004 Christmas Eve snowstorm, when 6 inches (150 mm) of snow fell as far south as McAllen.

Wildlife

Reptiles

Mammals

Sealife

Arthropods

Birds

Demographics and culture

Multicultural influences
South Texas is well known for strong Hispanic, primarily Mexican American and Tejano (the Spanish term for "Texan") influences, due to its proximity to Mexico. Tejanos and Mexicans living in South Texas are descended from the Spanish and Sephardic Jewish settlers of Mexico, from Mexican indigenous groups allied with the Spanish, such as Tlaxcaltec and Otomi peoples, and from local indigenous groups of South Texas who were missionized by the Spanish, particularly Coahuiltecans. These migrations occurred and have been ongoing since the early 1700s in South Texas. The Treaty of Guadalupe Hidalgo in the 1840s failed to secure land belonging to the Mexican settlers. The disputed area was between the Nueces River south of San Antonio and Corpus Christi, the King Ranch, and the Rio Grande. Recognized by neither Mexico nor the United States, the Republic of the Rio Grande was established in this region in 1840, lasting less than a year. Laredo served as its capital.

The Rio Grande Valley area played a significant role in the Mexican War of Independence, the Texas Revolution, the Mexican–American War, and the American Civil War, with many historical battle sites around the area. General Robert E. Lee resided at Fort Ringold (Rio Grande City) during this time as a colonel. President Zachary Taylor was General of the Army at Fort Brown (Brownsville) during the Mexican–American War.

The Texas Rangers gained popularity for their actions in South Texas during the Mexican bandit raids in the late 19th and early 20th centuries. On May 25, 1876, a band of 40 Texas Rangers rode out of Laredo and headed north to the Nueces Strip. Their mission was to find, kill or capture John King Fisher, leader of a band of cattle rustlers and cut-throats who had been terrorizing the area. The Rangers were members of a select group known as the Special Force. Led by Leander McNelly, the Special Force was given the task to bring law and order to an area of South Texas that lay between Corpus Christi and the Mexican border. San Antonio has the most significant African American population in all of South Texas.

Economy

Rice

An important event in the development of South Texas and the Texas Gulf Coast rice industry was the introduction of seed imported from Japan in 1904. The Houston Chamber of Commerce and the Southern Pacific Railroad invited Japanese farmers to Texas to help area farms in the production of rice. The seed the Japanese farmers brought with them was a gift from the Japanese emperor. The production of Japanese rice began at Webster in Harris County. The Gulf Coast rice industry is credited to the Saibara family.

Transportation

Air
San Antonio International Airport
Corpus Christi International Airport
Laredo International Airport
Valley International Airport
Victoria Regional Airport
McAllen Miller International Airport
Brownsville/South Padre Island International Airport
Alice International Airport
South Texas International Airport at Edinburg
Aransas County Airport
Kleberg County Airport
Duval-Freer Airport
Mustang Beach Airport
San José Island Airport

Passenger rail
San Antonio Amtrak station, serving two Amtrak lines; the Sunset Limited and the Texas Eagle; and Amtrak Thruway Motorcoach route serving Harlingen, Brownsville,  and McAllen, Texas.

Major highways

Interstate
 I-2
 I-10
 I-35
 I-37
 I-69C
 I-69E
 I-69W
 I-169
 I-410

US Routes
 US 59
 US 77
 US 83
 US 87
 US 90
 US 181
 US 281

Texas State Highways
 TX 4
 TX 16
 TX 44
 TX 107
 TX 141
 TX 151
 TX 255
 TX 285
 TX 286
 TX 336
 TX 358
 TX 359
 TX 361
 TX 495

International bridges
Laredo
Gateway to the Americas International Bridge
Juárez–Lincoln International Bridge
Texas Mexican Railway International Bridge
World Trade International Bridge
Laredo–Colombia Solidarity International Bridge
Eagle Pass
Eagle Pass–Piedras Negras International Bridge
Camino Real International Bridge
Union Pacific International Railroad Bridge
Brownsville
Brownsville & Matamoros International Bridge
Veterans International Bridge at Los Tomates
Gateway International Bridge
Los Indios
Free Trade International Bridge
Falcon Heights
Lake Falcon Dam International Crossing
HidalgoMcAllen
McAllen–Hidalgo–Reynosa International Bridge
Anzalduas International Bridge
Pharr
Pharr–Reynosa International Bridge
Progreso
Progreso–Nuevo Progreso International Bridge
Rio Grande City
Rio Grande City–Camargo International Bridge
Roma
Roma–Ciudad Miguel Alemán International Bridge

Tourism
San Antonio
San Antonio Missions National Historical Park
The Alamo
Tobin Center for the Performing Arts
Six Flags Fiesta Texas
San Antonio River Walk
San Antonio Zoo
SeaWorld San Antonio
San Antonio Museum of Art
San Antonio Stock Show & Rodeo
Corpus Christi
Mirador de la Flor (Selena Memorial Statue)
Texas State Aquarium
USS Lexington Museum Ship
Mustang Island and Mustang Island State Park
Padre Island National Seashore near Corpus Christi
Bayfest
Schlitterbahn
Laredo
San Agustin de Laredo Historic District
Republic of the Rio Grande Capitol Building Museum
Washington's Birthday Celebration festivities during January and February
Rio Grande Valley
South Padre Island
Gladys Porter Zoo in Brownsville
Basilica of the National Shrine of Our Lady of San Juan del Valle
Other
King Ranch near Kingsville
Aransas National Wildlife Refuge

Education

Colleges
Alamo Community College District
San Antonio College
Palo Alto College
St. Philip's College
Northeast Lakeview College
Northwest Vista College
Coastal Bend College
Alice Campus
Main Campus (Beeville)
Kingsville Campus
Pleasanton Campus
Del Mar College
Laredo Community College
Laredo Community College South Campus
South Texas College
Main Campus, McAllen
Tech Campus, McAllen
Nursing and Allied Health Campus, McAllen
Mid-Valley Campus, Weslaco
Starr County Campus, Rio Grande City
Texas State Technical College
Texas Southmost College

Public universities
Texas A&M International University (Laredo)
Texas A&M University–Corpus Christi
Texas A&M University–Kingsville (Texas A&I)
Texas A&M University–San Antonio
University of Houston–Victoria
University of Texas Health Science Center at San Antonio
University of Texas at San Antonio
University of Texas Rio Grande Valley (2015)
University of Texas at Brownsville
University of Texas–Pan American

Private universities
Our Lady of the Lake University
St. Mary's University
University of the Incarnate Word
Trinity University
Texas Lutheran University

Sports
The only major professional sports team in South Texas is the San Antonio Spurs in the NBA.

Area codes

210 - San Antonio, Bexar County
361 - Corpus Christi, Alice, Victoria, Kingsville, Rockport, Falfurrias
726 - San Antonio metropolitan area
830 - Eagle Pass, Floresville
956 - Laredo, Brownsville, McAllen, Mission, Edinburg
979 - only the southern half of this area is in South Texas

See also
List of geographical regions in Texas
List of Texas regions
Port of Corpus Christi
Tejano South Texas

References

Regions of Texas